{{DISPLAYTITLE:C7H8ClN}}
The molecular formula C7H8ClN (molar mass: 141.60 g/mol) may refer to:

 4-Chloro-o-toluidine (4-chloro-2-methylaniline)
 Starlicide (3-chloro-4-methylaniline)

Molecular formulas